Arthur Dawson (17 June 1891 – 17 July 1982) was an Australian rules footballer who played for the St Kilda Football Club in the Victorian Football League (VFL).

Notes

External links 

1891 births
1982 deaths
Australian rules footballers from Melbourne
St Kilda Football Club players
Brighton Football Club players
People from Scoresby, Victoria